This is a list of characters in the television series Criminal Minds, an American police procedural drama which premiered September 22, 2005, on CBS and concluded its original run on February 19, 2020. It is also shown on A&E and Ion Television in the United States. A sixteenth season of the show began airing on Paramount+ on November 24, 2022.

Main characters 

Notes

Dr. Spencer Reid 

Played by Matthew Gray Gubler, SSA Dr. Spencer Reid is a genius who graduated from Las Vegas High School at age 12. Reid's mother, Diana Reid has Schizophrenia and was sent to a mental hospital by Spencer himself when he turned 18. He is almost always introduced as Dr. Reid, even though the others are introduced as agents, because SSA Jason Gideon understood that people would not otherwise take Spencer seriously because of his young age. After an introduction, he never shakes hands.. It has been revealed that he holds Ph.D.s in Mathematics, Chemistry, and Engineering, B.A.s in Psychology and Sociology, and is working on a B.A. in Philosophy. Spencer is known for having an IQ of 187 and has an eidetic memory. Around the office, Reid often interrupts others' sentences with facts.  Matthew Gray Gubler confirmed that Reid has Asperger's Syndrome. In many episodes, Dr. Reid can be seen visiting his mother in her Las Vegas Mental Help/Nursing Home. In Season 4, "Memoriam", Reid experiences dreams, possibly nightmares, of a young boy being murdered. This was due to a series of events that happened in Reid's childhood. In the end, Reid saw his father after a 20-year absence, and found out that the murders in his dreams were indeed based on a real murder case and that his baseball coach, his mother, and his father were involved in the case, some criminally (his baseball coach), and some not criminally (his parents). Matthew Gray Gubler has been known for his many hairstyles throughout the continuing show. In almost every season his hair is different, whether it is a long man bob, or short Albert Einstein hair. Reid has also said that he was bullied when he was younger. Through the seasons Reid has faced many near death experiences and even had to be resuscitated while being held captive, tortured and drugged by Tobias Hankel (unsub from season 2 episode 15). Reid had made some attempts in finding love but only to have his girlfriend killed in-front of him by her stalker and later on to be terrorised by Cat Adams a top hitwomen whom framed Spencer for murder sending him to prison.

Jennifer Jareau 

Played by A. J. Cook, SSA Jennifer "JJ" Jareau originally acted as the team's Communication Liaison with the media and local police agencies and later turned to a full time agent in the field after returning from the Pentagon. She has two sons with her now husband Detective William LaMontagne Jr. (Josh Stewart), whom she met while the team was working a case in New Orleans in the season two episode "Jones" and married at the end of the season seven two-part finale, "Hit and Run". In the second episode of season six, JJ was forced to take a promotion to the Pentagon and left the team for the rest of the season. When JJ leaves the BAU for a promotion to a position at the Pentagon, Garcia and Hotch take up her responsibilities as media liaison, and Garcia retains this position when JJ returns to the BAU as a profiler. Jennifer returned to the show in the episode entitled "Lauren", in which she receives a call and returns to help the BAU find Emily Prentiss and capture Ian Doyle before it is too late. When Emily is stabbed by Doyle and rushed to a hospital, Jennifer announces she did not survive. However, it is later revealed that Emily is alive and Jennifer meets her at a cafe in Paris, where she provides her with three passports and bank accounts to start a new life in hiding. She returns once again in the season six finale before returning as a full-time cast member again in season seven. In the finale of season 14, JJ reveals to Reid that she was in love with him during a hostage situation.

In 2015, the actress announced she was expecting her second child, which was written into JJ's storyline. The character's children are portrayed by A.J. Cook's real-life sons Mekhai Anderson and Phoenix Andersen.

Penelope Garcia 

Played by Kirsten Vangsness, Penelope García is the team's technical analyst at BAU headquarters in Quantico, Virginia. She is flamboyant, a nonconformist, kind, and fun-loving and provides the rest of the team with comic and compassionate relief whenever it is needed. Penelope is an only child, and her parents were both killed in a tragic car accident when she was a minor. She was later adopted, and her last name was changed to García by her adoptive parents. Although she is an Anglo-Caucasian, she celebrates presumably Mexican/Mexican-American traditions from her adoptive parents. She and SSA Morgan share a very friendly-flirty relationship that never goes beyond that, although Penelope does show mild jealousy when she sees him dancing with two other women. In turn, Morgan, responds negatively when asked for proposal advice by her then boyfriend, fellow FBI computer tech Kevin Lynch. Penelope taught herself to hack after she dropped out of college and was aligned with the best underground hackers in the world. After being caught by the FBI, she was given a choice of living in a high-security prison for the rest of her life or working for the BAU division of the FBI as an analyst. Two episodes focus on García's character. In "Penelope", she was shot and almost killed. When Jennifer Jareau leaves the BAU for a promotion to a position at the Pentagon, Garcia volunteers to take up her responsibilities as media liaison, completely changing her looks. She quickly realizes the job is not for her and resumes her job as a technical analyst. The liaison position is then split between her and Hotch, a job she retains when JJ returns to the BAU as a profiler. In "The Black Queen", Penelope's past is brought up after a series of flashbacks. In those flashbacks, viewers see a Goth-looking Garcia. Her background and history are revealed, indicating that her extraordinary computer skills are self-taught. She is overcome by guilt by her past actions, so much so that when her hacker ex-boyfriend needs to be caught, she volunteers to be bait. She is really uncomfortable in this situation and says that she would never do it again. Garcia states that she didn't know why she was ever "that" person.

Emily Prentiss 

Played by Paget Brewster, SSA Emily Prentiss is the daughter of an ambassador and a U.S. diplomat. After Agent Elle Greenaway leaves the BAU permanently following a case in which she had shot an unsub in cold blood, Prentiss shows up with papers stating she is the newest member of the BAU, which catches both Hotch and Gideon off guard since they hadn't signed off on her transfer. She became a permanent member of the team in "Lessons Learned" where it was revealed that she was fluent in Arabic. She also has a tough relationship with her mother. She got pregnant at the age of 15 and later chose to have an abortion. Prentiss is also skilled at chess.

In "The Thirteenth Step" (episode 6.13), Prentiss receives some disturbing news from her previous boss at Interpol. In the following episode, "Sense Memory", after coming home from work, she notices that someone had been in her house because her cat's back was wet and her window was open. She also received several strange phone calls, with the caller ID saying "Caller Unknown". This also leaves Agent Morgan concerned for Prentiss. Prentiss appears in only 18 episodes of season 6. She faked her death to escape an old nemesis with the help of both Hotch and JJ while the rest of the team continued to assume she was dead. In season seven premiere ("It Takes a Village"), Emily returns to the team when Doyle resurfaces and she rejoins by the end of the episode. At the end of the season, she leaves the team to return and run Interpol in London.

She returns for the 200th episode to help rescue a kidnapped SSA Jennifer Jareau and again in the episode "Tribute" (season 11), where she enlists the help of the BAU in catching a serial killer who had originally killed in Europe before killing in the United States. Paget Brewster was confirmed to return for a several episode arc in Season 12. Following the dismissal of Thomas Gibson, Brewster was promoted to a series regular again starting from Season 12, episode 3; later Prentiss is promoted to Hotch's position of unit chief.

David Rossi 

Played by Joe Mantegna, Senior Supervisory Special Agent David Rossi, a "'founding father' of the BAU", was in early retirement from 1997 until his voluntary return to the BAU in 2007, replacing Jason Gideon, who had abruptly resigned from the BAU. He had retired in order to write books and go on lecture tours, but he returned to settle some unfinished business that was not immediately specified. It was later revealed that the case involved three young children whose parents had been murdered in a possible home-invasion case that had remained unsolved. This case haunted Rossi for twenty years and prompted him to return to the BAU, where he eventually solved it. He served in the Vietnam war and lost a close friend which was revealed in a series of flashbacks.

Dr. Tara Lewis 

Played by Aisha Tyler, Lewis is Callahan's and JJ's temporary replacement while they are both on maternity leave. Dr. Tara Lewis is a psychologist with an eye on forensic psychology and its application toward the criminal justice system. Her dream was to study psychopaths up close and personal – and her psychology background, combined with her experience in the FBI, brought her face-to-face with monsters. Her job was to stare them down and interview them, in order to determine if they were fit to stand trial. In the process, she made herself find the humanity inside these broken men (and, sometimes, women) in order to learn if there was a conscience behind their brutal crimes. Lewis is also fluent in both French and German.

Luke Alvez 

Played by former CSI: Miami star Adam Rodríguez, Fugitive Task Force Agent and Supervisory Special Agent. Alvez is a member of the FBI Fugitive Task Force that partners with the BAU to catch the escaped serial killers that escaped in the Season 11 finale. In the Season 12 premiere he works with the BAU to catch the "Crimson King", one of the escapees that attacked Alvez's old partner. The team discovers the real killer is "Mr. Scratch" who taunts the team by turning over the real "Crimson King", who was tortured to the point he no longer remembered who he was. After that Alvez decides to join the BAU full-time and was Hotch's last hire. Alvez has a dog named Roxy (whom Garcia thought at first was his human girlfriend) and served in Iraq as an Army Ranger prior to joining the FBI.

Matt Simmons 

Played by Daniel Henney, SSA Matthew "Matt" Simmons is a Special Operations agent and special agent with the IRT. Simmons is married to his wife Kristy (Kelly Frye) and has a total of four young children, including sons Jake and David and twin daughters Lily and Chloe. Like Garrett, Simmons' full and fulfilling family life was a deliberate choice. Through his job, Simmons has some prior history with Derek Morgan and JJ of the FBI's Behavioral Analysis Unit. He was a former member of a Special Ops unit, and his experience with the unit allowed him to hone his profiling skills.

Former

Jason Gideon 

Played by Mandy Patinkin, Senior Supervisory Special Agent Jason Gideon was the BAU's best profiler. He helped Derek Morgan and Spencer Reid through their nightmares. He was shown to have a very close relationship with Reid, having hand-picked him from the FBI Academy for his team, helping Reid through many difficulties (including his implied drug use), and even leaving the good-bye letter for Reid to find. Gideon did not know Garcia well, as expressed through an episode wherein he is placed with her while he is on crutches; after they are placed, Garcia complains about him, and he doesn't know her name. Through the first two seasons, Gideon was portrayed to be very good at chess, winning against Reid many times (only exception being Reid's birthday) and encouraging him to "think outside the box". Prior to the series, he was said to have had a "nervous breakdown" (or "major depressive episode") after he sent six men into a warehouse with a bomb in it; all six agents were killed, and he was heavily criticized about the event. He showed particular dislike for the practice of using religion as a defense or motivation for one's crimes. Gideon participated in some field operations during his time with the BAU and had the rest of his team "think outside the box" as well, as he made a major advancement by shouting at the top of his lungs with pleas of mercy and, when questioned by his team, he said that the victims were being threatened to be kept quiet as neighbors would have heard the pleas if they were unrestrained. He blamed himself for the torture Reid received from Tobias Hankel as he had ordered Penelope Garcia to add a virus warning to the videos Hankel posted. Gideon also had a son named Stephen. The nature of their relationship has not been directly stated, but it was implied that they have not seen each other very recently. Gideon began to lose confidence in his profiling skills after Frank Breitkopf murdered his girlfriend, Sarah Jacobs. During his final case in Arizona, he further lost faith in his abilities when his decision to release the unsub resulted in the deaths of both the unsub and a young woman. As a result of his actions, Aaron Hotchner was suspended, which was the final straw for Gideon. He then left his cabin shortly afterwards, leaving his gun and badge behind along with a letter for Reid to find as he sought to regain a belief in happy endings.

In the season ten episode "Nelson's Sparrow", Gideon was murdered off-screen, having been shot dead at a close range by a serial killer named Donnie Mallick (Arye Gross), which prompts the BAU team to investigate Gideon's murder. During the flashbacks focusing on a young version of him for the episode which show him working at the BAU in 1978, he is played by Ben Savage.

Elle Greenaway 

Played by Lola Glaudini, SSA Elle Greenaway was formerly assigned to FBI Field Office in Seattle, Washington, and was assigned to the BAU, being an expert in sexual offense crimes. Her father was a police officer but was killed in the line of duty. She is half Cuban and speaks Spanish. She is shot by an unsub. Though she physically recovers, the event leaves her with psychological scars.

As a result of those scars, Elle begins acting even more harshly in season two, especially during a case involving a serial rapist. Ultimately, she kills the suspect before he could even be properly arrested. During this episode, she mentions that the unsub wrote on the wall with her blood from the wound. She hands in her badge and gun in the episode "The Boogeyman", saying that it is not an admission of guilt.

Ashley Seaver 

Played by Rachel Nichols, Ashley Seaver is an FBI cadet assigned to the BAU. Her father, Charles Beauchamp, was a horrific serial killer from North Dakota known as "the Redmond Ripper" who killed 25 women over the course of 10 years before Ashley was a teenager. He was caught by David Rossi and Aaron Hotchner. Because North Dakota does not have capital punishment, he was sentenced to life in prison. She has not been to see him. Though he writes to her sometimes, she never reads his letters, though she does keep them and admittedly still finds herself unable to hate him for what he did. In the episode "What Happens at Home", the BAU investigate a series of murders in a gated community and bring Ashley along because of her understanding of the family dynamics of a serial killer. In the end, the suspect commits suicide by cop in front of her. In the next episode, she requests that the rest of her remedial training be done with the BAU and is attached to the team. In the season seven premiere "It Takes a Village", it was revealed that Ashley transferred to the Domestic Trafficking Task Force, which is led by Andi Swann.

Dr. Alex Blake 

Played by Jeanne Tripplehorn, FBI Linguistics expert Dr. Alex Blake replaces SSA Emily Prentiss. She is introduced in season eight. Her appointment at the BAU was met with some mixed reactions as the team was close to Prentiss. She retired in 2001 until she rejoined the BAU in 2012 to restore her reputation after Blake was blamed for arresting the wrong suspect in the Amerithrax case and Section Chief Erin Strauss let her take the fall. As a result, she and Strauss do not get along, with Strauss accusing her of joining for selfish reasons, but they eventually make amends. The rest of the team recognize her expertise and are generally less antagonistic towards her. As season eight progressed, Blake found herself in danger when she was threatened by a serial killer, 'The Replicator', who turned out to be John Curtis: a fellow former FBI agent disgraced due to the events of the Amerithrax case, who targeted Blake out of envy that she had restored her reputation while his own was still in ruins. Curtis killed Strauss, kidnapped Blake, and tried to blow up the entire BAU team, but the team rescued her, and Rossi locked Curtis in the house to die when the bomb exploded as vengeance for Strauss's death.

Blake graduated from Berkeley with a double major and also holds a PhD. She was recruited to the FBI at the age of 24, making her one of at least two team members to join the Bureau in their early 20s along with Spencer Reid. Blake is also a professor of forensic linguistics at Georgetown, where Reid had previously guest lectured, and an SSA in the Washington field office. During her initial time at the FBI, Blake was involved in some high-profile cases, particularly the Unabomber case. Blake understands and speaks American Sign Language.

In the season nine episode "Bully", it is revealed that Blake is estranged from her father Damon (a retired police captain of the Kansas City Police Department) and younger brother Scott (a current homicide detective there himself); after the death of her older brother Danny (a cop killed in the line of duty) and her mother, she found it too painful to be near her father and brother, and distanced herself from them. However, after Scott is injured by the UnSub, the two siblings start to reconnect, and by the end of the episode, she reconciles with both Scott and Damon when she and the rest of the BAU team have a barbecue at her father's home.

In the season nine two-part finale, Blake becomes distraught and depressed when Reid is shot in the neck by the UnSub after pushing Blake out of the way and nearly dies, even commenting that it should have been her who was shot instead. She is also further upset when rescuing a young boy who was being used by the UnSub as leverage against his mother. Though Reid survives, Alex is greatly shaken by the case, and reveals to Reid that both he and the young boy reminded her of her deceased son Ethan, who died of an unnamed neurological disease at age nine. Her guilt and distress over Reid's brush with death touched a major nerve with her, seemingly pushing her to the breaking point. At the end of the "Demons", she sits apart from the rest of the group on the plane ride home, and it is implied that she sends a text message to Hotch handing in her resignation. After taking Reid home, telling him about Ethan, and departing, Reid finds her FBI badge in his bag, and watches her leave, saddened but accepting, from his window.

Kate Callahan 

Played by former Ghost Whisperer star Jennifer Love Hewitt, Kate Callahan has been in the FBI for eight years and has experience as an undercover agent, which has allowed her to establish a prior friendship with members of the BAU. Her sister and brother-in-law were killed in the September 11 attacks, leaving Kate as the legal guardian of their infant daughter, Meg, whom she raised for thirteen years along with her husband, Chris. This tragedy shaped her patriotic attitude. She is described as "smart, charming, and wise for her years" and holds a passion for making the world safer, according to showrunner Erica Messer. In the episode "Breath Play", Kate reveals she is pregnant. In the season ten finale, "The Hunt", Meg is abducted by human traffickers who are connected to a previous case that Kate had researched. Though Meg is eventually brought back safe, Kate decides to take a year off to spend with Meg, Chris, and her soon-to-be-born child.

Derek Morgan 

Played by Shemar Moore, SSA Derek Morgan is a confident and assertive everyman character, the son of an African-American father and white mother. He went to Northwestern University on a football scholarship, holds a black belt in judo, runs FBI self-defense classes, and served in a bomb squad unit and as a Chicago police officer. In season two it was explained that after the death of his father when he was ten, Derek struggled somewhat: youthful fighting earned him a juvenile offender record. He was taken under the wing of a local youth center coordinator, Carl Buford (Julius Tennon), who acted as a surrogate father to Derek and helped him to obtain a college football scholarship. But he also sexually abused him; the episode "Profiler, Profiled" revealed this. In season three, it is revealed that he hates religion because, as he says, something bad happened to him when he was 13. He went to church every day and prayed for it to stop, but it did not. Because of this, he had resentment toward God and the church. He prays for the first time in 20 years at exactly the time, he later finds out, that Penelope Garcia is being operated on after being shot. Former Unit Chief Aaron Hotchner promotes him to unit chief in his place, a promotion Derek saw as only temporary until the "Boston Reaper" was captured. Aaron again takes his place as unit chief when he returns after grieving over his ex-wife's murder. He resigns to care for his family.

Aaron Hotchner 

Played by Thomas Gibson, Unit Chief SSA Aaron "Hotch" Hotchner used to be a prosecutor and was formerly assigned to the FBI field office in Seattle. After stepping down for a period, he returned to lead the unit. He has a son named Jack (Cade Owens) by his deceased wife Haley (Meredith Monroe). The two eventually divorced and remained on good terms until Haley was murdered by George Foyet (C. Thomas Howell), Aaron's Nemesis. Aaron's attempts to balance his family life and his job have been something of an ongoing struggle on the show. When Jennifer Jareau leaves the BAU for a promotion to a position at the Pentagon, Garcia and Hotch take up her responsibilities as media liaison, and Garcia retains this position when JJ returns to the BAU as a profiler. But in the episodes "Closing Time", "A Family Affair", and "Run", it is shown that he has moved on and is currently in a romantic relationship with Beth Clemmons (Bellamy Young). It is known that "Hotch" is rarely seen smiling throughout the show. His most notable smiles are when he is with his now girlfriend and his son. Gibson appeared in 1–2 episodes in the forthcoming season; he was then immediately removed as a cast member.

Stephen Walker 

Played by actor and conductor Damon Gupton, Walker is a Supervisory Special Agent with the BAU. Walker was a member of the Behavioral Analysis Program. He was contacted by Emily Prentiss about joining the BAU to assist in the manhunt for Peter Lewis, a.k.a. "Mr. Scratch". Walker is an experienced profiler, with about twenty years under his belt, and a member of the FBI's Behavioral Analysis Program before his transfer to the BAU. He is married to a woman named Monica and has two children with her, Maya and Eli. He met Emily Prentiss, then the chief of Interpol's London office, during his line of work. He was also mentored by David Rossi. Stephen's first case concerned a terrorist cell in Belgium, and three agents were sent undercover to infiltrate it. However, Stephen's profile was wrong, and this resulted in the deaths of the undercover agents. He eventually moved on from the trauma and improved as he went along in his career. He and other BAP agents, including his longtime friend Sam Bower, were sent undercover to investigate corruption in the Russian government. Walker's skills include being fluent in Russian and playing the trombone. In "Wheels Up", Walker dies from injuries during a car accident with a semi-truck by Peter Lewis a.k.a. Mr. Scratch.

Recurring

Current

Agent Grant Anderson 
Played by Brian Appel, Agent Anderson appears in "Plain Sight" (episode 1.4)", The Fisher King" (1.22 and 2.1), "The Big Game" (2.14), as well as "Honor Among Thieves" (2.20), "The Crossing" (3.18), "100" (5.9), "The Slave of Duty" (5.10), "Hope" (7.8), "Hit" (7.23), "Run" (7.24), "Carbon Copy" (8.16), "The Replicator" (8.24), "To Bear Witness" (9.4), and "200" (9.14). Agent Anderson is told to drive Elle home in "The Fisher King", and he drops her off at her front door and leaves. She was soon shot by The Fisher King, as he had already been there, waiting for her. Hotch scolds Anderson briefly for not doing more, and quickly sends him back to the scene of the crime.

Agent Josh Cramer 
Played by Gonzalo Menendez, Agent Josh Cramer runs the FBI Field Office in Baltimore, Maryland, as well as the Organized Crime division in that city. The two episodes which take place in Baltimore, "Natural Born Killer" (1.8) and "Honor Among Thieves" (2.20) both have him liaising with the BAU.

Diana Reid 
As played by Jane Lynch, Diana Reid is Dr. Spencer Reid's mother. She first appears as a potential target of serial killer Randall Garner, the man who shoots SSA Elle Greenaway. Like her son, Diana has a genius level IQ. She was once a university literature professor, but is no longer since her diagnosis of schizophrenia. She currently resides at the Las Vegas-based Bennington Sanitarium, where Spencer committed her when he was eighteen. Her husband, William Reid, left her when Spencer was a child. The reason William left is because he was aware Diana witnessed a murder, as a family friend avenged his own son's murder. He was unable to live with this knowledge though he claims he tried; he said "the weight of knowing what happened was just too much". Much of Diana and Spencer's time while he was growing up was spent with her reading to him. Spencer writes her a letter every single day because he feels guilty about not visiting her. In season 11, Spencer takes some time off from the BAU to visit her. In "Entropy", he reveals she has early signs of dementia and when he first walked in her room, she didn't know who he was for three seconds.

Kevin Lynch 
Played by Nicholas Brendon, Kevin was Penelope Garcia's replacement when she was briefly suspended and hospitalized. He is a former hacker like her, but he is far messier. Garcia is denied access to her system during her suspension from the BAU. Kevin takes over in the interim. He is immediately impressed with the system she has set up and her GUI. Garcia attempts to hack into the database under his watch. Kevin is unable to block her. They are each impressed with the other's work, but Garcia establishes dominance. When they finally meet face-to-face, they fall in love instantly. Kevin remains in awe of Garcia. They've developed a dating relationship in spite of Garcia's "special" relationship/mutual admiration with Agent Morgan. This is revealed at the beginning of "Damaged", when Agent Rossi shows up at Garcia's apartment only to find the quirky twosome showering together.
In the Season 6 finale, "Supply & Demand", they profess their love for each other. Later in the show Penelope brings him in for a case in Season 6.

William LaMontagne Jr. 
Played by Josh Stewart, LaMontagne is the husband of Special Agent Jennifer Jareau. He is a homicide detective who worked for the New Orleans Police Department and is now with the Metro PD. In the season two episode "Jones", it is revealed that his father William Sr. was a detective himself in the NOPD and was killed during Hurricane Katrina as he was working a case in his home and refused to leave during the mass evacuations. The case later resurfaced and LaMontagne enlisted the help of the BAU. While they were there, he and JJ became romantically involved, although he wasn't mentioned again until "In Heat". In that episode, he was brought to Miami where the unsub had killed a friend and colleague of his. During the episode, it was revealed that he and JJ had been secretly contacting each other since "Jones". JJ didn't want to reveal their relationship since she believed it would complicate their personal lives, but in the end, they went public with it. At the end of the episode, it is revealed that Prentiss, Morgan and Reid already knew about it. In the episode "The Crossing", JJ discovered she was pregnant and they have a boy named Henry. The actual status of JJ and Will's relationship (engaged, married, etc.) has not been disclosed, though they exchanged rings with Henry's birthstone in season four. In the season three finale, it is revealed that he transferred to Metro to move to Virginia to be with JJ and raise Henry together. To conclude season seven, he and JJ marry in a small ceremony in David Rossi's back yard.

The character was written back in after A.J. Cook told the writers she was pregnant, and as such JJ needed a love interest. In addition, one of the original plans for the season seven finale was to kill off Will. However, this idea was scrapped due to Paget's impending departure.

Jack Hotchner 
Played by Cade Owens, Jack Hotchner is the son of series regular Aaron Hotchner, his first appearance being in "The Fox". His mother, Haley Hotchner, is killed in season five by George Foyet (a.k.a. "The Boston Reaper") but is spared when his father gives him a secret signal to "work the case" (hide in the trunk in Hotch's office). It is shown in season seven's "Painless" that Jack is being bullied. Jack is shown to have become good friends with Beth Clemmons, his father's new girlfriend.

Lindsey Vaughan 
Played by Gia Mantegna (Joe Mantegna's daughter), Lindsey Vaughan is the daughter of a hitman and first appears in the season three episode 3rd Life. The BAU initially believe her to be a victim of "Jack" until they track her to a school and discover that she is a willing accomplice, input under the witness protection program after a hit ordered by Irish mobsters designed to kill her father wound up killing her mother instead. She reappears in season twelve as Diana Reid's nurse using the name Dr. Carol Atkinson. Reid immediately recognises her as Lindsey Vaughan and later remembers that she was Mr. Scratch's accomplice from the hotel in Mexico but is taken back to his cell before he can warn Diana, later being revealed that she is the accomplice, and girlfriend, of Cat Adams.

Henry LaMontagne 
Played by Mekhai Andersen (A.J. Cook's son), Henry LaMontagne is the first son of Jennifer Jareau and William LaMontagne Jr., his first appearance being in "100".

Mateo Cruz 
Played by Esai Morales, Cruz is the new Section Chief of the BAU. All that is known about him is that he worked at the Pentagon prior to season nine and has a past with JJ.

It was revealed in "200" that the two had worked on a task force together in the Middle East. He was the only person to know of her pregnancy and her miscarriage during her time on the task force. In the same episode, they are both kidnapped by Tavin Askari, who was a traitor within the task force. They are both physically and mentally tortured into giving the access codes given to them during the mission. He is shocked to discover that Michael Hastings, one of the men they had worked with on the task force, was the mastermind behind the plan and threatened to rape JJ in order to give him the access codes. He gives in and is later stabbed by Askari, who was quickly killed by Hotch. Cruz is taken to the hospital following the incident and survives. Cruz later appears in the season nine finale "Demons", where he accepts a case from the sheriff who is a personal friend. When the sheriff is killed and Reid is shot, both Cruz and Garcia fly to Texas to meet with the rest of the team. He is next seen in the pilot episode for the upcoming spinoff, entitled Criminal Minds: Beyond Borders, which was the nineteenth episode of season ten. He enlists the BAU to help the international team find a vicious international killer in Barbados.

Joy Struthers 
Played by Amber Stevens West, Joy is Rossi's daughter from his short-lived second marriage to French diplomat Hayden Montgomery. When they divorced, Hayden didn't tell him she was pregnant and Joy thought her father was her mother's second husband, who finally told her the truth before dying from cancer. In the episode "Fate" (10x09), Joy sought Rossi out and they're getting to know each other. Joy is a reporter and true crime writer and is married with a 2-year-old son named Kai.

Former

Erin Strauss 
Played by Jayne Atkinson, Erin Strauss was the BAU Section Chief, the direct superior to SSA Aaron Hotchner. Her job lies in administration, and she has little field experience. She is an alcoholic, as revealed in the seventh-season episode "Self-Fulfilling Prophecy" when she rants at the commandant of a military academy and Morgan smells alcohol on her breath. At the end of the episode, Hotchner and Morgan arrange for her to check in privately at a treatment facility, thus protecting her from losing her job.

Strauss becomes more prominent in season eight. It is revealed in "The Silencer" that the newest member of the BAU team, Alex Blake, worked with her during the Amerithrax case, during which Strauss left her to take the fall when a linguistics flub led to the arrest of the wrong suspect. As a result, Blake did not get along with her afterwards. At the end of "The Silencer", Strauss tries apologizing to her, but Blake turns Strauss down. In "Carbon Copy", she specifically oversees the investigation into the Replicator, and by the end of the episode, she apologizes to Blake again, and this time, her apology is accepted. In "Brothers Hotchner", she is abducted by the Replicator, later revealed to be a former FBI agent named John Curtis, whom she left to take the blame along with Blake following the Amerithrax case. In "The Replicator", Erin Strauss is killed in the line of duty when Curtis poisons her with spiked wine and leaves her to die. She is found on the streets by Hotch, and she admits that the Replicator forced her at gunpoint to drink again. She dies in Hotch's arms after begging him to stay with her as she does not want to die alone. Strauss indirectly helps defeat Curtis post mortem when Rossi uses her sobriety chip to escape his trap, leaving him to possibly die in an explosion. After her funeral, the team celebrates her life during dinner at Rossi's garden, discussing happy stories of her time with them and acknowledging her as a good woman, friend, and mother.

Haley Hotchner 
Played by Meredith Monroe, Haley Hotchner was the wife of Aaron Hotchner. She and Hotchner have a son, Jack. They divorced due to Hotch's job and duties. In season three, Aaron Hotchner picks up his home phone when someone calls, but when he answers it, the caller hangs up. Haley's cellphone starts ringing immediately afterward. Hotch looks at Haley, but she does not say anything. It is implied that Haley might be cheating on Aaron, and that is why the person who called the home phone did not speak when a man answered. She is shot and killed by Hotch's nemesis, George Foyet (a.k.a. "The Boston Reaper"). She returned in season nine, episode five, in a vision while Hotch was recovering from complications from his stabbing 100 episodes earlier.

Jordan Todd 
Played by Meta Golding, Todd is JJ's replacement while she's on maternity leave. She was introduced to the team in Catching Out and was mentored and trained by JJ until JJ went into labor. Prior to that, she had spent 7 years working for the FBI's counter-terrorism unit. In the end, she announced that she would return there and that JJ would end her maternity leave and return to the team.

Dr. Savannah Morgan 
Played by Rochelle Aytes, Savannah Morgan (née Hayes) is Derek Morgan's wife. She works as a doctor at Bethesda General Hospital. Savannah first appeared in Season Nine's "The Return", and it is presumed that Morgan and Savannah started dating prior to Season Nine and first met after she approached him when he was depressed over a case that ended badly. Before they started dating, they used to be neighbors. She was introduced to the show because Shemar Moore, the actor who portrays Morgan, had requested that his character get a romantic partner. She was last seen giving birth to her and Derek's son, Hank Spencer Morgan, after being shot by Chazz Montolo.

Peter Lewis 
Played by Bodhi Elfman, Peter Lewis (aka Mr. Scratch) is a proxy killer who poisons his victims causing them to kill people for him. He is first hunted by the BAU in season 10. He escapes from prison in season 11 and continues killing in season 12. He also stalked SSA Aaron Hotchner's son, Jack, forcing them to go into witness protection. In the season 13 premiere, "Wheels Up," he is cornered by the team and falls to his death off the edge of a building.

Characters from Suspect Behavior 
 Samuel "Sam" Cooper – portrayed by Forest Whitaker
 Beth Griffith – portrayed by Janeane Garofalo
 Jonathan "Prophet" Sims – portrayed by Michael Kelly
 Gina LaSalle – portrayed by Beau Garrett
 Mick Rawson – portrayed by Matt Ryan
 Jack Fickler – portrayed by Richard Schiff

Characters from Beyond Borders 

 Jack Garrett – portrayed by Gary Sinise
 Clara Seger – portrayed by Alana de la Garza
 Matthew "Matt" Simmons – portrayed by Daniel Henney
 Russ "Monty" Montgomery – portrayed by Tyler James Williams
 Mae Jarvis – portrayed by Annie Funke

References

Episode sources 

	
	
	
	
	
	
	
	
	
	
	
	
	
	
	
	
	
	
	
	
	
	
	
	
	
	
	
	
	
	
	
	
	
	
	
	

 
Criminal Minds
Criminal Minds